Tevita Manumua (born 12 February 1993), is a Tongan born Romanian rugby union player who plays as a Centre for CEC Bank SuperLiga club Timișoara Saracens and will make his debut for the Romanian national rugby 7`s team.

References

External links
Superliga Player Profile
EuroSport Player Profile

1993 births
People from Tongatapu
Living people
Tongan rugby union players
Romanian rugby union players
Rugby union centres